Blue Haze is a compilation album of tracks recorded in 1953 and 1954 by Miles Davis for Prestige Records.

Overview
The album is a reissue in 12" format of the 10" LP Miles Davis Quartet (PRLP 161), with "I'll Remember April" added.  Tracks 4, 6, 7, and 8 come from Prestige PREP 1326, The Miles Davis Quartet, recorded May 19, 1953.  It features a quartet with John Lewis on piano —replaced on "Smooch" by its co-composer Charles Mingus— Percy Heath, the bassist throughout the album, and Max Roach on drums.  Tracks 2, 3, and 5, from March 15, 1954, with Horace Silver on piano and Art Blakey on drums, were first released on PREP 1360, titled Miles Davis Quartet. The first track on the album, "I'll Remember April", is from the April 3, 1954, session and was originally included on the 10" LP Miles Davis Quintet (PRLP 185).

The compositions "Four" and "Tune Up" were always credited to Davis, although both were claimed by Eddie Vinson to be his compositions. Vinson was a known blues singer at that time and had no use for them and gave Davis permission to record them. No one expressed opposition to the false crediting until decades later.

The album's last track, "Miles Ahead" is not the same composition as featured on the 1957 Columbia Records album Miles Ahead, a big band recording arranged by Gil Evans. The "Miles Ahead" played on Blue Haze is a contrafact, and features a new melody played over the chord changes to John Lewis' tune "Milestones", recorded by Davis in 1947 for Savoy Records.

Track listing
Prestige – LP 7054

Personnel
Track #1 (April 3, 1954)
Miles Davis – trumpet
David Schildkraut – alto saxophone
Horace Silver – piano
Percy Heath – bass
Kenny Clarke – drums

Track #2, 3 and 5 (March 15, 1954)
Miles Davis – trumpet
Horace Silver – piano
Percy Heath – bass
Art Blakey – drums

Track #4, 6, 7 and 8 (May 19, 1953)
Miles Davis – trumpet
John Lewis – piano (6, 7, 8)
Charles Mingus – piano (4)
Percy Heath – bass
Max Roach – drums

References

1956 compilation albums
Albums produced by Bob Weinstock
Albums produced by Ira Gitler
Albums recorded at Van Gelder Studio
Instrumental albums
Miles Davis albums
Prestige Records compilation albums